The Umatilla National Wildlife Refuge is located on and around the Columbia River about  northwest of Hermiston, Oregon and includes  in Oregon, and  in Washington. It was established in 1969 to help mitigate habitat lose due to the flooding that occurred following the construction of the John Day Dam. The refuge is popular with birdwatchers and wildlife enthusiasts.

The refuge is a varied mix of open water, sloughs, shallow marsh, seasonal wetlands, cropland, islands, and shrub-steppe upland habitats. It is divided into six units—two in Oregon, three in Washington, and one in the middle of the Columbia River. The scarcity of wetlands and other natural habitats in this area make Umatilla National Wildlife Refuge vital to migrating waterfowl, bald eagles, colonial nesting birds, and other migratory and resident wildlife. It is strategically located within the Pacific Flyway to provide Arctic nesting geese and ducks a wintering site and a resting stopover.

References

External links
Umatilla National Wildlife Refuge U.S. Fish and Wildlife Service

National Wildlife Refuges in Washington (state)
National Wildlife Refuges in Oregon
Protected areas of Benton County, Washington
Protected areas of Morrow County, Oregon
Protected areas established in 1969
Columbia River
1969 establishments in Oregon
Wetlands of Oregon
Wetlands of Washington (state)
Landforms of Benton County, Washington
Landforms of Morrow County, Oregon
1969 establishments in Washington (state)